Pritchardia waialealeana, the poleline pritchardia,   is a species of palm tree that is endemic to the island of Kauai in Hawaii, United States.

References

waialealeana
Endemic flora of Hawaii
Biota of Kauai
Trees of Hawaii
Taxonomy articles created by Polbot